The Royal Parks of London are lands that were originally used for the recreation, mostly hunting, of the royal family. They are part of the hereditary possessions of The Crown, now managed by The Royal Parks Limited, a charity which manages eight royal parks and certain other areas of parkland in London. The Royal Parks charity was created as a company limited by guarantee in March 2017 and officially launched in July 2017. Its chief executive is Andrew Scattergood.

The charity took over the main responsibilities of management from the Royal Parks Agency – a former executive agency of the Department for Culture, Media and Sport – and from the Royal Parks Foundation, which is a separate charity.

Parks
With increasing urbanisation of London, some of these were preserved as freely accessible open space and became public parks with the introduction of the Crown Lands Act 1851. There are today eight parks formally described by this name and they cover almost   of land in Greater London.

 Bushy Park, 
 Green Park, 
 Greenwich Park, 
 Hyde Park, 
 Kensington Gardens, 
 Regent's Park, 
 Richmond Park, 955 hectares
 St. James's Park, 

Of these, the largest green spaces in central London are Regent's Park, the adjacent Hyde Park/Kensington Gardens, and Green Park/St James's Park (also close to each other). Bushy Park, Greenwich Park and Richmond Park are in the outer boroughs.

The Royal Parks Agency manages other open spaces: the Brompton Cemetery, Grosvenor Square Gardens, Victoria Tower Gardens and the gardens of 10, 11 and 12 Downing Street.
Hampton Court Park is also a royal park within Greater London,  it is administered by the Historic Royal Palaces, unlike the eight Royal Parks.

Management
The parks were managed by the Royal Parks Agency (an executive agency of the Department for Culture, Media and Sport) until the agency joined with charity the Royal Parks Foundation to form a new charity – The Royal Parks – launched in July 2017. The parks are policed by the Royal Parks Operational Command Unit of the Metropolitan Police (the English section of the previous force policing the parks, the Royal Parks Constabulary, has been abolished). Some funding for the Royal Parks comes from a central government grant. This contrasts with most of London's other parks, which are funded by local borough councils. The Royal Parks charity generates the majority of its income from commercial activities such as catering and staging public events such as concerts.

Role

The charity's primary focus is to support and manage 5,000 acres of Crown-owned parkland across London. These are:
Hyde Park, 
Kensington Gardens, 
Richmond Park, 
Bushy Park, 
St James's Park, 
The Green Park, 
The Regent's Park and Primrose Hill, and
Greenwich Park.

The charity runs programmes of activities and events to encourage outdoor recreation and public access to these areas. It also allows third parties to run such activities within the grounds to further these objectives, but commercial activity is tightly controlled.

The Royal Parks charity also regulates filming, audio recording and the taking of photographs in these areas for anything other than personal use through the issuing of licences. It also issues news permits to the media for the specific purpose of covering breaking news items relating to the parks. Holders of the licences and permits are required to comply with the following pieces of legislation:

 The Royal Parks and Other Open Spaces Regulations 1997
 Royal Parks and Other Open Spaces (Amendment) Regulations 2004

As well as the eight royal parks in its care, the charity also manages Brompton Cemetery, Victoria Tower Gardens, Poets' Corner and Canning Green. It also tends to the gardens of 10, 11 and 12 Downing Street.

The parks are owned by the Crown with their responsibility resting with the Secretary of State for the Department for Digital, Culture, Media and Sport. The Royal Parks charity manages the parks on behalf of the government.

Charitable objectives
The Royal Parks' charitable objects set out the main purpose of the charity and what it aims to achieve. They are:

To protect, conserve, maintain and care for the royal parks, including their natural and designed landscapes and built environment, to a high standard consistent with their historic, horticultural, environmental and architectural importance;
To promote the use and enjoyment of the royal parks for public recreation, health and well-being including through the provision of sporting and cultural activities and events which effectively advance the objects;
To maintain and develop the biodiversity of the royal parks, including the protection of their wildlife and natural environment, together with promoting sustainability in the management and use of the royal parks;
To support the advancement of education by promoting public understanding of the history, culture, heritage and natural environment of the royal parks and (by way of comparison) elsewhere; and
To promote national heritage including by hosting and facilitating ceremonies of state or of national importance within and in the vicinity of the royal parks.

The Royal Parks board
The Royal Parks charity is led by a board of trustees, which decides how the charity is run, how it spends its money and ensures what it does is for the benefit of the parks and their visitors. The trustees are led by a chairman, and are appointed for their skills and experience. Alongside some ex-officio roles, others are appointed by the Secretary of State for the Department for Digital, Culture, Media and Sport (DCMS) and the Greater London Authority (GLA). They are non-executive and unpaid.

The members of The Royal Parks charity's board are: Loyd Grossman CBE (Chairman), Councillor Nickie Aiken, Ruth Anderson, Heather Blackman, Lt Col Michael Vernon, Bronwyn Hill CBE, Wesley Kerr OBE, Jeff Jacobs, Councillor Georgia Gould, Richard Hamilton and Councillor Danny Thorpe.

The Royal Parks senior management team
The senior management team oversees the day-to-day running of the Royal Parks charity. Led by a chief executive, the team recommend the charity's policy and strategy to the board of trustees, as well as managing an expert and committed workforce of staff and volunteers dedicated to offering free open space in London. Its members (as of November 2020) were:
Andrew Scattergood – Chief Executive
Liz Mullins – Director of Commercial
Ali Jeremy – Director of Communications and Engagement
Darren Woodward – Director of Estates and Projects
Tom Jarvis – Director of Parks

Legal position
The public does not have any legal right to use the parks, as public access depends on the grace and favour of the Crown, although there are public rights of way across the land. Until 2017, the Royal Parks Agency managed the Royal Parks under powers derived from section 22 of the Crown Lands Act 1851. As part of its statutory management function the agency permitted the public to use the parks for recreational purposes, subject to regulations issued under the Parks Regulation Acts 1872–1926 which were considered necessary to secure proper management, preserve order and prevent abuse within the parks. The Royal Parks and Other Open Spaces Regulations 1997 then came into effect until a separate charity took over the parks from the Royal Parks Agency.

Mayoral control
In 2010, then Mayor of London Boris Johnson proposed that control over the Royal Parks should be devolved to the Greater London Authority and the government put forward proposals for that to happen later on that year. The plan was welcomed by Royal Parks but not implemented.

Discrimination/pay dispute over outsourced park attendants 
Since 2014, Vinci Facilities has been contracted to maintain the Royal Parks, employing as cleaners/attendants mainly African migrants. Vinci had originally tendered separate bids costed for minimum wage staff and Living Wage staff – and its minimum wage bid was accepted, meaning that the approximately 50 cleaners/attendants were earning £8.21 an hour by 2019. Then, with several joining UVW union in pursuit of the London Living Wage (£10.75) and going on strike in October 2019 with further strikes planned, the Royal Parks board agreed to fulfil their wage demands in December 2019, backdated to November 1st.

However, during the tendering process, Vinci and Royal Parks had also determined purely statutory entitlements in respect of overtime, on-call allowance, sick pay, annual leave, pensions, redundancy pay and maternity pay – and these inequalities with Royal Parks employees persisted. The two employers had allegedly repeatedly reviewed the general terms of Vinci's staff between 2014 and 2019, and Royal Parks had never opted to improve any part of their contracts.

It was announced in April 2020 that the barrister Changez Khan and 15 claimants would bring a racial discrimination "landmark test case" against the Royal Parks charity. Khan claims that "the difference in pay until December last year and ongoing difference in other conditions have a 'disparate impact' on black and ethnic minority workers, as they are more likely to be outsourced agency workers."

See also
Parks and open spaces in London
Walking in London

References

External links

 

2017 establishments in England
Charities based in London
Department for Digital, Culture, Media and Sport
Gardening in England
Government-owned companies of the United Kingdom